MTVU (formerly stylized as MtvU and mtvU) is an American digital cable TV channel owned by the MTV Entertainment Group, a unit of the Paramount Media Networks division of Paramount Global. The channel was first known as VH1 Uno from 2000 to 2004 before changing names when Viacom expanded MTVU programming beyond more than 750 college and university campuses across the United States, as part of internally originated cable systems that are a part of on-campus housing or college closed-circuit television systems to digital cable in all homes. Music videos played on the channel primarily consist of indie rock, pop punk and hip-hop along with limited original programming. MTVU also launched a short-lived campus guide and social media network called Campusdailyguide.com in 2008.

In 2018, the MTV Networks on Campus group was sold by Viacom to Cheddar to launch CheddarU, but the digital cable channel remained to the public through digital cable.

History 

MTV Networks' proposal for a channel targeting college students, tentatively called MTV University, became public in February 2002. According to The New York Times, the channel was seeking to compete with Burly Bear Network, which was available to 450 campuses and had been attracting nearly a million viewers a week, along with College Television Network (CTN) and the most recent entrant at the time, Zilo.

Seven months later, after CTN experienced financial difficulties and as National Lampoon had just acquired the defunct Burly Bear, MTV Networks acquired CTN for $15 million.

MTVU also formerly owned RateMyProfessors.com and in 2006 acquired content management software platform for college newspapers College Publisher Network (later College Media Network) parent company Youth Media & Marketing Network (Y2M) in 2006 before selling it in 2010 to Access Network, who sold it to Uloop in 2014. 

In February 2008, MTV Networks discontinued VH1 Uno, a sparsely viewed Spanish language music video channel, and replaced it with MTVU, to expand the channel into traditional cable distribution.

In May 2018, Cheddar TV acquired Viacom's MTV Networks on Campus; outlets associated with that service were converted to carry CheddarU, a new secondary feed which stream content from the flagship financial-news streaming service and segments from Cheddar Big News to 9 million students on more than 600 campuses; universities which previously screened MTV Networks on Campus will continue to receive CheddarU at no cost in exchange for access to the campus (the cable version of MTVU has continued under an automated form). CheddarU is part of the ChedNet division of Cheddar, a division focusing on bringing the service to public screens such as gyms, bars, airports, hotel and other public venues.

Over time, MTVU has lost cable carriage throughout time with the growth of the Internet, and has generally been depreciated by ViacomCBS in current retransmission consent negotiations with cable and streaming providers, with Spectrum removing it from their current-day packages in 2018. Only grandfathered subscribers with older packages have access to the network on that provider. The channel uses archived campus footage and interviews rather than producing new interstitials. The company uses the network and MTV Live for video premieres.

Programming 
According to its promotional materials from 2004 to 2018, MTVU broadcast exclusive content dedicated to aspects of college life, including music, news, and on-campus events. The channel was the first MTV network to stream all of its content online. On-campus events included the Campus Invasion tour, featuring up-and-coming bands; the GAME0Rz Ball tour, which brings new video games to campus; and Tailgate Tour, which provides MTVU with a presence at campus tailgates. MTVU shows included Dean's List, the MTVU Awards, and MTVU Spring Break.

Currently, MTVU plays a mix of music videos with an emphasis on emerging artists and short interestistial segments focusing on college life. Previously at each hour, MTVU broadcast news updates from ABC News (and before that CBS News until late 2006 in the wake of the Viacom/CBS split), including international news and college-related news. Twice an hour, MTV News once aired stories on subjects such as music downloading, and musical artists under promotion by MTVU.

Additionally, MTVU aired several original programs produced by and featuring college students. The Freshmen featured three rotating student panelists discussing new music videos and was hosted by Kim Stolz; Stand-In brought celebrities and intellectuals into college classrooms to teach for a day, and featured people such as Nobel Laureates Elie Wiesel and Shimon Peres; Madonna; John McCain; Marilyn Manson; and Jhumpa Lahiri. It has also started a social networking site "Meet or Delete", along with HP.

Awards

MTVU Woodie Awards 
MTVU formerly broadcast its own semi-annual awards show, the MTV Woodies, which it states recognizes "the music voted best by college students." Previous winners have included 2005's Death Cab for Cutie, Motion City Soundtrack, and The Afters; 2006 winners include Thirty Seconds to Mars, Plain White T's, mewithoutYou, The Subways and Gnarls Barkley. The 2006 ceremony was also notable for the altercation of Elijah Wood and Scott from the music blog Stereogum with Jared Leto. The 2008 awards had a huge fan voting for the Best Music On Campus award, where The Bride Wore Black won the award and Chasing Arrows came in right behind. Winners at the 2008 Woodie Awards included Paramore and There for Tomorrow. Winners at the 2009 Woodie Awards included Green Day, Kings of Leon, Matt & Kim, NeverShoutNever, Tech N9ne and Hotel of the Laughing Tree. Winners at the 2014 Woodie Awards include Beyoncé, Drake, Ed Sheeran, and Skrillex. Fall Out Boy will become the first inductees at "Hall of Wood" at the 2015 Woodie Awards. They had won the Streaming Woodie award for "Grand Theft Autumn" at the first ceremony in 2004.

Awards for students 
The online game Darfur is Dying was developed as part of an MTVU contest, and other Sudan genocide coverage won MTVU two Emmys, including the 2006 Governors Award. Its Half of Us initiative won a Peabody Award in 2007 "for its extensive research and dedication to fighting depression and creating quick routes to convenient solutions." MTVU also provided grants for student activists, giving away $1,000 a week to various student groups. MTVU formerly co-sponsored the ecomagination Challenge with GE, which aimed to empower college students to solve environmental problems on campuses.  MTVU also sponsored the Film Your Issue competition, a competition designed to encourage college-age filmmakers to make short political pieces, and aired the winners.

Other opportunities that MTVU provided for college students include Digital Incubator grants, which awarded students who are pioneering the future of broadband content, and the Student Filmmaker Award, which provided the winner with the chance to receive a development deal with MTVU and collect the award at the MTV Movie Awards. Besides these competitions, MTVU made efforts to use student work through its programming.

Winners 
Woodie of the Year
 2004: Modest Mouse - "Float On"
 2005: My Chemical Romance
 2006: Angels & Airwaves
 2007: Gym Class Heroes
 2008: Paramore
 2009: Kings of Leon
 2010: Not Awarded Woodie of the Year
 2011: Wiz Khalifa - "Black and Yellow"
 2012: Mac Miller
 2013: Machine Gun Kelly
 2014: Drake
 2015: Porter Robinson
 2016: Not Awarded Woodie of the Year
 2017: The Chainsmokers
Breaking Woodie
 2004: The Killers - "Somebody Told Me"
 2005: Motion City Soundtrack
 2006: Plain White T's
 2007: Boys Like Girls
 2008: Afterhour
 2009: Never Shout Never
 2010: Not Awarded Breaking Woodie
 2011: Two Door Cinema Club
 2012: Machine Gun Kelly
 2013: Earl Sweatshirt
 2014: The 1975
Left Field Woodie
 2004: N.E.R.D - "Maybe"
 2005: MewithoutYou
 2006: Gnarls Barkley
 2007: Madvillain
 2008: Chromeo
 2009: Tech N9ne
 2010: Not Awarded Left Field Woodie
 2011: Kanye West
Good Woodie
 2004: Sum 41
 2005: U2
 2006: Serj Tankian
 2007: Guster
 2008: Jack's Mannequin
 2009: Jamie Tworkowski
Road Woodie
 2004: Coheed and Cambria
 2005: Fall Out Boy
 2006: Taking Back Sunday
Streaming Woodie
 2004: Fall Out Boy - "Grand Theft Autumn/Where Is Your Boy"
 2005: The Afters - "Beautiful Love"
 2006 - O.A.R. - "Love and Memories"
Welcome Back Woodie
 2004: Incubus
Soundtrack of My Life Woodie
 2004: Coheed and Cambria - In Keeping Secrets of Silent Earth: 3
The  Jump Woodie
 2004: Taking Back Sunday - "A Decade Under the Influence"
The Silent But Deadly Woodie
 2004: Modest Mouse - "Float On"
Best Video Woodie
 2005: Gorillaz - "Feel Good Inc." (Best Video Woodie - Animation)
 2005: Death Cab for Cutie - "Title and Registration" (Best Video Woodie - Live Action)
 2006: Gorillaz - "El Mañana" (Best Video Woodie - Animation)
 2006: Thirty Seconds to Mars - "The Kill" (Best Video Woodie - Live Action)
 2007: Say Anything - "Wow, I Can Get Sexual Too"
 2008: Motion City Soundtrack - "It Had to Be You"
 2009: Matt and Kim - "Lessons Learned"
 2010: Not Awarded Best Video Woodie
 2011: Chiddy Bang - "Opposite of Adults"
 2012: Best Coast - "Our Deal"
 2013: Danny Brown - "Grown Up"
 2014: Chance the Rapper, Saba & BJ the Chicago Kid - "Everybody's Something"
 2015: Childish Gambino - "Sober"
International Woodie
 2005: Muse
 2006: The Subways
Alumni Woodie 
 2005: Green Day
 2006: AFI
 2007: Spoon
Performing Woodie
 2007: Muse
 2008: Atmosphere
 2009: Green Day
 2010: Not Awarded Performing Woodie
 2011: Matt and Kim
 2012: Mac Miller
 2013: Not Awarded Performing Woodie
 2014: Ed Sheeran
Best Music On Campus Woodie
 2008: The Bride Wore Black
 2009: Hotel of the Laughing Tree
College Radio Woodie
 2009: KUPS (University of Puget Sound)
 2010: WICB (Ithaca College)
 2011: WVUM (University of Miami)
 2012: WASU-FM (Appalachian State University)
 2013: KSUA (University of Alaska Fairbanks)
 2014: WESS (East Stroudsburg University)
 2015: WPTS-FM (University of Pittsburgh)

EDM Effect Woodie
 2012: Calvin Harris & Rihanna - "We Found Love"
Fomo Woodie
 2013: The Weeknd
Tag Team Woodie
 2013: Kimbra, Mark Foster & A-Trak - "Warrior
Branching Out Woodie
 2013: Macklemore & Ryan Lewis
Chevrolet Sonic Collage Artist Woodie
 2013: The Lonely Biscuits
Cover Woodie
 2014: Bastille - "We Can't Stop" (Miley Cyrus)
 2015: Taylor Swift - "Riptide" (Vance Joy)
 2016: Not Awarded Cover Woodie
 2017: Ed Sheeran - "Touch" (Little Mix)
Did it My Way Woodie
 2014: Beyoncé
Best Collaboration Woodie
 2014: ASAP Rocky, Skrillex & Birdy Nam Nam - "Wild for the Night"
Woodie to Watch
 2015: Years & Years
 2016: Not Awarded Woodie to Watch
 2017: Khalid
Co-Sign Woodie
 2015: Hoodie Allen & Ed Sheeran - "All About It"
Next Level Performance Woodie
 2015: Childish Gambino
Social Climber Woodie
 2015: Jack & Jack
Woodie Songwriter of the Year
 2017: PartyNextDoor

References

External links 
 

MTV channels
Music video networks in the United States
Television channels and stations established in 2008
English-language television stations in the United States
Companies based in New York City